Luciana Begazo Medina (born August 4, 1999, in Camaná, Peru) is a Peruvian model and beauty pageant titleholder who was crowned Miss Teen International 2019 in Ecuador. She is the first Peruvian to win the Miss Teen International title.

Pageantry

Miss Teen Peru 2018
As Miss Teen Arequipa, she competed in the Miss Teen Peru contest where she won the Miss Teen Peru International title.

Miss Teen International 2019

See also
Rodrigo Moreira

References

External links

1999 births
Living people
Peruvian beauty pageant winners
Peruvian female models
21st-century Peruvian women